Kalinovka is a rural locality (a khutor) in Semyonovskoye Rural Settlement, Kamyshinsky District, Volgograd Oblast, Russia. The population was 301 as of 2010. There are 6 streets.

Geography 
Kalinovka is located on the Volga Upland, 67 km northwest of Kamyshin (the district's administrative centre) by road. Semyonovka is the nearest rural locality.

References 

Rural localities in Kamyshinsky District